Jacco Eltingh and Paul Haarhuis were the defending champions, but Eltingh did not compete this year.

Haarhuis teamed up with Sjeng Schalken and successfully defended his title, by defeating Devin Bowen and Eyal Ran 6–3, 6–2 in the final.

Seeds

Draw

Draw

References

External links
 Official results archive (ATP)
 Official results archive (ITF)

Doubles